The Eje Central or Avenida Lázaro Cárdenas is an avenue in the Cuauhtémoc and Gustavo A. Madero boroughs of Mexico City, Mexico. It is part of a system called eje vial of roadways built by Carlos Hank González to modernize Mexico City for improved traffic flow through the city. As its name indicates, it runs through the central zones of the city, starting at Río de los Remedios Avenue (in the limits of Mexico City and Tlalnepantla, State of Mexico) and ending at Río Churubusco Avenue, near Eje Central metro station.

Public transportation

Metro
Several Mexico City Metro stations are also located on Eje Central, most notably the Eje Central station of Line 12. Line 8 runs under Eje Central on its stretch that crosses downtown Mexico City.

Metro stations
Politécnico 
Autobuses del Norte 
Instituto del Petróleo  
La Raza  
Garibaldi / Lagunilla  
Bellas Artes  
San Juan de Letrán 
Salto del Agua  
Doctores 
Obrera 
Lázaro Cárdenas 
Eje Central

Trolleybus

Trolleybus Line 1, also known as Corredor Cero Emisiones Eje Central Lázaro Cárdenas (Zero Emissions Corridor), runs through Eje Central from the Northern Bus Station to the Southern Bus Station (near Tasqueña metro station).

See also
 Eje vial, the whole system

External links

Streets in Mexico City
Cuauhtémoc, Mexico City